Kelvin Pruenster (born December 6, 1960, in Toronto, Ontario) is a former professional Canadian football offensive lineman who played nine seasons in the Canadian Football League for the Toronto Argonauts.

References

Career Stats

1960 births
Living people
Canadian football people from Toronto
Players of Canadian football from Ontario
Canadian football offensive linemen
Toronto Argonauts players
Cal Poly Pomona Broncos football players